Acidomonas is a genus in the phylum Pseudomonadota (Bacteria). The genus contains  single species, namely A. methanolica, formerly known as Acetobacter methanolicus

Etymology
The name Acidomonas derives from:Latin adjective acidus, sour, acid; Latin feminine gender noun monas (μονάς), nominally meaning "a unit", but in effect meaning a bacterium; New Latin feminine gender noun acidomonas, acidophilic monad.

The specific epithet methanolica derives from New Latin neuter gender noun methanol, methanol; Latin suff. -icus -a -um, suffix used in adjectives with the sense of belonging to; New Latin feminine gender adjective methanolica, relating to methanol.

Members of the genus Acidomonas can be referred to as acidomonad (viz. Trivialisation of names).

See also
 Bacterial taxonomy
 Microbiology

References 

Bacteria genera
Rhodospirillales
Monotypic bacteria genera